Kapar may refer to:

Kapar
Kapar, Iran
Kapar Judaki
Kapar (federal constituency), represented in the Dewan Rakyat